Ait Ouallal (Berber languages: ⴰⵢⵜ ⵡⴰⵍⵍⴰⵍ, Arabic: آيت ولال, also known as Ait Ouzzine and Ajmou Amajgal) is a rural municipality in the Zagora Province, in the region of Draa Tafilalet, Morocco. Based on the 2004 census, Ait Ouallal has 9649 inhabitants.

Neighboring municipalities
1. N'kob
2. Tazzarine

Climate
Ait Ouallal, Zagora has a desert climate (Köppen climate classification BWh).

See also
 List of municipalities, communes, and arrondissements of Morocco

References 

Populated places in Zagora Province
Rural communes of Drâa-Tafilalet